The 2002–03 Czech Extraliga season was the 10th season of the Czech Extraliga since its creation after the breakup of Czechoslovakia and the Czechoslovak First Ice Hockey League in 1993.

Standings

Playoffs

Quarterfinal
 HC IPB Pojišťovna Pardubice - HC Excalibur Znojemští Orli 2:1 (1:0,0:1,1:0)
 HC IPB Pojišťovna Pardubice - HC Excalibur Znojemští Orli 7:1 (4:0,1:0,2:1)
 HC Excalibur Znojemští Orli - HC IPB Pojišťovna Pardubice 3:2 (1:0,1:2,1:0)
 HC Excalibur Znojemští Orli - HC IPB Pojišťovna Pardubice 4:1 (1:0,2:0,1:1)
 HC IPB Pojišťovna Pardubice - HC Excalibur Znojemští Orli 3:1 (1:1,0:0,2:0)
 HC Excalibur Znojemští Orli - HC IPB Pojišťovna Pardubice 1:2 (0:1,1:1,0:0)
 HC Oceláři Třinec - HC Vítkovice 3:2 (0:0,1:0,2:2)
 HC Oceláři Třinec - HC Vítkovice 1:2 (0:1,1:1,0:0)
 HC Vítkovice - HC Oceláři Třinec 1:0 SN (0:0,0:0,0:0,0:0)
 HC Vítkovice - HC Oceláři Třinec 0:7 (0:2,0:3,0:2)
 HC Oceláři Třinec - HC Vítkovice 1:0 (0:0,0:0,1:0)
 HC Vítkovice - HC Oceláři Třinec 2:6 (1:3,1:1,0:2)
 HC Slavia Praha - HC Vsetín 2:0 (1:0,1:0,0:0)
 HC Slavia Praha - HC Vsetín 5:1 (2:0,3:1,0:0)
 HC Vsetín - HC Slavia Praha 1:2 SN (0:0,1:1,0:0,0:0)
 HC Vsetín - HC Slavia Praha 0:6 (0:0,0:3,0:3)
 HC Sparta Praha - HC České Budějovice 3:1 (3:0,0:1,0:0)
 HC Sparta Praha - HC České Budějovice 4:0 (2:0,1:0,1:0)
 HC České Budějovice - HC Sparta Praha 1:2 (0:1,1:0,0:1)
 HC České Budějovice - HC Sparta Praha 0:5 (0:0,0:4,0:1)

Semifinal
 HC IPB Pojišťovna Pardubice - HC Oceláři Třinec 10:2 (2:0,4:1,4:1)
 HC IPB Pojišťovna Pardubice - HC Oceláři Třinec 3:4 (1:1,1:3,1:0)
 HC Oceláři Třinec - HC IPB Pojišťovna Pardubice 1:4 (0:0,1:3,0:1)
 HC Oceláři Třinec - HC IPB Pojišťovna Pardubice 4:2 (1:1,2:1,1:0)
 HC IPB Pojišťovna Pardubice - HC Oceláři Třinec 7:2 (1:1,2:0,4:1)
 HC Oceláři Třinec - HC IPB Pojišťovna Pardubice 4:5 PP (1:1,2:2,1:1,0:1)
 HC Slavia Praha - HC Sparta Praha 0:2 (0:0,0:0,0:2)
 HC Slavia Praha - HC Sparta Praha 2:0 (0:0,0:0,2:0)
 HC Sparta Praha - HC Slavia Praha 2:3 SN (0:1,1:0,1:1,0:0)
 HC Sparta Praha - HC Slavia Praha 3:4 SN (1:0,0:1,2:2,0:0)
 HC Slavia Praha - HC Sparta Praha 1:2 (0:0,1:2,0:0)
 HC Sparta Praha - HC Slavia Praha 2:5 (1:3,1:1,0:1)

Final
HC Slavia Praha - HC IPB Pojistovna Pardubice 0–1, 4–2, 5–4, 2–0, 3–4, 1–5, 1-0

HC Slavia Praha is Czech champion for 2002–03.

Relegation

 HC Havířov - HC Vagnerplast Kladno 5:4 PP (0:3,3:1,1:0,1:0)
 HC Havířov - HC Vagnerplast Kladno 2:3 (1:1,1:0,0:2)
 HC Vagnerplast Kladno - HC Havířov 5:3 (2:2,0:1,3:0)
 HC Vagnerplast Kladno - HC Havířov 9:1 (3:0,1:0,5:1)
 HC Havířov - HC Vagnerplast Kladno 3:1 (1:0,1:0,1:1)
 HC Vagnerplast Kladno - HC Havířov 2:0 (0:0,1:0,1:0)

References

External links 
 

Czech Extraliga seasons
1
Czech